The West Brownsville Junction Bridge carries the Norfolk Southern Railway across the Monongahela River from Brownsville Township to West Brownsville in the state of Pennsylvania. The main span is a  Pennsylvania (Petit) truss. The structure was originally designed by the Pennsylvania Railroad as a low-level connector between its mainline and Waynesburg Branch. Today, the bridge continues to serve the same purpose that it has since its inception, carrying coal trains between mines and power plants or other industrial sites.

See also
List of bridges documented by the Historic American Engineering Record in Pennsylvania
List of crossings of the Monongahela River

References

External links

Bridges in Fayette County, Pennsylvania
Bridges in Washington County, Pennsylvania
Bridges over the Monongahela River
Railroad bridges in Pennsylvania
Historic American Engineering Record in Pennsylvania
Pennsylvania truss bridges in the United States
Metal bridges in the United States